The large moth family Crambidae contains the following genera beginning with "L":

References 

 L
Crambid